Klemen Ferjan (born 12 October 1979) is a former Slovenian judoka.

Currently he is building up a career in aviation. Klemen has served nearly 3 years as the Alternate Representative on the Council of the International Civil Aviation Organization (ICAO). He has been representing Central European Rotation Group (CERG) in providing continuing direction to ICAO’s work of fostering safe, secure and sustainable international aviation, including with respect to the review and adoption of international standards and recommended practices. 
His area of special interest is economic development of air transport; hence as IATA Consultant he revived Airline Operational Cost Task Force (currently Airline Cost Management Group) in 2012 and significantly increased airlines’ participation in 2013 and 2014.

Klemen holds an M.B.A. degree from the John Molson School of Business at Concordia University and Diploma in Civil Aviation Management. He also serves on the board of directors of Fondation Amal, mentors young budding entrepreneurs and is an avid judo instructor.

Achievements

References

External links
 
 

1979 births
Living people
Slovenian male judoka
Mediterranean Games silver medalists for Slovenia
Mediterranean Games medalists in judo
Competitors at the 2005 Mediterranean Games